The Gewehr 41 (German for: rifle 41), commonly known as the G41(W) or G41(M), denoting the manufacturer (Walther or Mauser), are two distinct and different battle rifles manufactured and used by Nazi Germany during World War II. They were largely superseded by the Gewehr 43, which was derived from the G41(W), but with an improved gas system and other detail changes.

Background
By 1940, it became apparent that some form of a semi-automatic rifle with a higher rate of fire than existing bolt-action rifle models were necessary to improve the infantry's combat efficiency. The Army issued a specification to various manufacturers, and Mauser and Walther submitted prototypes that were very similar. However, some restrictions were placed upon the design:

 no holes were to be bored into the barrel for tapping gas for the loading mechanism;
 the rifles were not to have any moving parts on the surface;
 and in case the auto-loading mechanism failed, a bolt action was to be included.

Both designs used a mechanism known as the "Bang" system (after its Danish designer Søren H. Bang). In this system, propellant gases were captured by a cone-shaped gas trap at the muzzle, which in turn deflected them to operate a small piston which in turn pushed on a long piston rod that opened the breech and re-loaded the gun. This is as opposed to the more common type of gas-actuated system, in which gases are tapped off from the barrel, and pushed back on a piston to open the breech to the rear. Both also included fixed 10-round magazines that were loaded using two of the stripper clips from the Karabiner 98k, utilizing the same German-standard 7.92×57mm Mauser rounds. This in turn made reloading relatively slow (as compared to rifles that had magazines that could be reloaded from a single unit, such as the M1 Garand, although it was typical for its time, being identical to the reloading procedure of the 10-round Lee–Enfield).

The Mauser design, the G41(M), was the only one of the two that respected the criteria imposed. The end result was an overly complex, unreliable, clunky, and heavy rifle. It incorporated a familiar sighting and control arrangement to the standard Kar98k rifle. The G41(M) was striker-fired, rotating-bolt locking, and featured a traditional bolt handle/charging handle that automatically disconnected the bolt assembly from the recoil spring should the rifle be used in manual mode. The flag-type safety cams and blocks the striker. Only 6,673 were produced before production was halted, and of these, 1,673 were returned as unusable. Accuracy issues were noted since the front sight was mounted on the gas tube in front of the barrel, which would begin to drift out of alignment after prolonged fire. Most metal parts on this rifle were machined steel and some rifles, especially later examples, utilized the Bakelite type plastic hand guards.

The Walther design was more successful because the designers had simply ignored the last two restrictions listed above. Lacking the turn-bolt disconnector, the upper receiver was less exposed than the Mauser version. However, both the Walther and Mauser versions suffered from gas system fouling problems, since gasses at the muzzle cool down and deposit solid carbon fouling. These problems also seemed to stem from the muzzle trap system becoming excessively corroded from the use of corrosive salts in the ammunition primers. The muzzle assembly consisted of many tight-fitting parts and was difficult to keep clean, disassemble, and maintain in field conditions.

G41(W) rifles were produced at two factories, namely Walther at Zella Mehlis, and Berlin-Lübecker Maschinenfabrik. Walther guns bear the ac code, and WaA359 inspection proofs, while BLM guns bear the duv code with WaA214 inspection proofs. These rifles are also relatively scarce, and quite valuable in collector grade. Varying sources put production figures between 40,000 and 145,000 units. Again, these rifles saw a high attrition rate on the Eastern front.

The Walther rifle was redesigned in 1943 into the Gewehr 43, utilizing a short-stroke piston copied from the SVT-40 rifle, and implementing a conventional detachable box magazine.

References

"New German Semi-Automatic Rifle", Tactical and Technical Trends, No. 27, June 1943.

External links 
 
 Forgotten Weapons: Mauser Gewehr 41 (M)
 Forgotten Weapons: Walther Gewehr 41 (W)
 Gewehr 41 (M), Beschreibung, Handhabungs- und Behandlungsanleitung, vom 26.5.41
 Gewehr 41 (W), Beschreibung, Handhabung und Behandlung, vom 16.2.43

7.92×57mm Mauser semi-automatic rifles
World War II infantry weapons of Germany
World War II semi-automatic rifles
Rifles of Germany
Weapons and ammunition introduced in 1941